Geraldton (Greenstone Regional) Airport  is located  north of Geraldton, Ontario, Canada.

See also
Geraldton/Hutchison Lake Water Aerodrome

References

External links

Certified airports in Ontario
Transport in Thunder Bay District